Mount Achkasar is a  tall mountain in Northern Armenia. Achkasar is highest peak of the Javakhk range in the Lesser Caucasus Mountains.

See also 
Javakheti Plateau
Mount Leyli
Mount Yemlikli

Image gallery

References 

Mountains of Armenia
Kvemo Kartli